Nancy L. deClaissé-Walford (born December 21, 1954) (PhD, Baylor University) is an American theologian, specialist in the Hebrew language and Biblical studies. She is Carolyn Ward Professor of Old Testament and Biblical Languages and Advisor for the Academic Research Track at McAfee School of Theology, Mercer University, Atlanta.

She was awarded a Ph.D. 1995, Baylor University, M.A. 1985, Fuller Theological Seminary, B.A. Ancient History 1976, California State University, Northridge.

Also acts as the Word Biblical Commentary series Old Testament editor and has served for 20 years on the editorial board for the Review & Expositor journal. She is known for her work and commentaries on Psalms, where she advocates feminist critical reading of the Psalter.

Works

Books

References

External links 
 

20th-century American theologians
1954 births
Living people
Mercer University faculty
Baylor University alumni
Fuller Theological Seminary alumni
California State University, Northridge alumni